Tiia Toomet (born 9 February 1947) is an Estonian writer and poet.

Toomet was born in Tallinn. She graduated from the University of Tartu, studying history. She also graduated from the State Art Institute (now the Estonian Academy of Arts), studying textile art.

She has been the director of the Tartu Toy Museum.

Selected works
She has written about 40 children's books.

References

Living people
1947 births
20th-century Estonian women writers
21st-century Estonian women writers
Estonian children's writers
Estonian women children's writers
Estonian women poets
20th-century Estonian poets
21st-century Estonian poets
University of Tartu alumni
Writers from Tallinn